The Joseph Gaston House is a house located in southwest Portland, Oregon listed on the National Register of Historic Places. It is located in the southernmost part of the Goose Hollow neighborhood. The house was named for Joseph P. Gaston and is also known as the Gaston-Holman House.

See also
 National Register of Historic Places listings in Southwest Portland, Oregon

References

Further reading

1911 establishments in Oregon
Bungalow architecture in Oregon
Goose Hollow, Portland, Oregon
Houses completed in 1911
Houses on the National Register of Historic Places in Portland, Oregon
Portland Historic Landmarks